Phragmochaeta canicularis is an extinct animal belonging to the annelids and lived in the Early Cambrian (Atdabanian in the local timescale, about 520 million years ago). Fossils have only been found in the Buen Formation at the Sirius Passet Lagerstätte, Greenland and the animal is probably the first polychaete.

Etymology 
The genus name Phragmochaeta references the thatch−like appearance of the chaetae, hence reeds (Greek: phragmites). The species epithet canicularis is derived from the Latin for "dog" (canis) in reference to Sirius ("dog-star") Passet.

Description 

Drawing from roughly 40 fossils Phragmochaeta consisted of about twenty segments, each of which carried structures typical of the annelids polychaetes (notochaetae and neurochetae). The notochaetae seemed to cover the entire dorsal surface, while the neurochaetae projected obliquely along the axis of the body. The head is not well known, but it seems there was no type of jaw. The intestine was unbent and has large longitudinal musculature.

Lifestyle 
It probably was a benthic animal, which lived on the bottom of the sea and probably ate particles present on the seabed. This animal moved thanks to the neurochete, while the dorsal notochets provided protection.

Classification 
This animal belonged to the annelates polychaetes, a group of animals currently represented by numerous marine species. Already in the middle Cambrian of Burgess Shales they were present with numerous species (Burgessochaeta, Canadia, Peronochaeta), but Phragmochaeta, antecedent of some millions of years, represents the oldest polychaete and was probably one of the most primitive.

Importance 

Polychaetes are rare in the Maotianshan Shales, in China, also dating back to the lower Cambrian. This is particularly surprising because the Chinese field has a very wide biological variety. The only Cambrian field containing polychaetes is that of Burgess Shale, in Canada, a little later. Phragmochaeta, therefore, represents an exception as the oldest known polychaete.

References

Bibliography 
 

Polychaetes
Cambrian invertebrates
Cambrian animals of North America
Cambrian Greenland
Fossils of Greenland
Buen Formation
Fossil taxa described in 2008
Cambrian genus extinctions